Pino Concialdi (Caccamo, 1946 – Termini Imerese, 17 November 2015) was an Italian painter.

Biography 
He began to devote himself to painting as an autodidact.

Concialdi said he used a deliberately expressionist pictorial language, that allowed him to express freely as possible his creative impulses. His consisted solely of self portraits, putting himself in dramatic environments and often backgrounds gloomy. 
He also collaborated with artists of international standing like Silvio Benedetto and Croce Taravella. His work has been covered in the journal Arte Moderna.

He died suddenly on 17 November 2015.

Collections 
 Museum Bagheria in Italy
 Museo del Arte Mediterraneo

References

External links
 http://www.museum-bagheria.it/pinoconcialdi.html
 http://archivio.blogsicilia.it/tag/pino-concialdi/

1946 births
2015 deaths
20th-century Italian painters
Italian male painters
Artists from Palermo
Painters from Sicily
20th-century Italian male artists